Liucun is a town in Yaodu District, Linfen, Shanxi province, China. , it has four residential neighborhoods and 31 villages under its administration: 
Residential neighborhoods
Binxi Community
Caihong Community
Gaotie Community
Yifen Community

Villages
Liubei Village
Liunan Village
Liuxi Village
Yangjiazhuang Village
Beiliu Village
Gaodui Village
Guanchang Village
Jiaquan Village
Beilu Village
Nanlu Village
Mawu Village
Beiduan Village
Nanduan Village
Wogou Village
Bozhuang Village
Puzi Village
Boduan Village
Shaqiao Village
Mazhan Village
Jiantou Village
Qiaojiayuan Village
Zhoujiazhuang Village
Taojiazhuang Village
Fanjiazhuang Village
Shangjianbei Village
Dongyi Village
Kongjiazhuang Village
Qingcheng Village
Jianshang Village
Zuoyi Village
Wokou Village

See also 
 List of township-level divisions of Shanxi

References 

Township-level divisions of Shanxi
Linfen